John Newcome may refer to:

 John Newcome (politician) (died 1938), independent Irish politician
 John Newcome (academic) (1684–1765), academic and priest

See also
 John Newcombe (born 1944), Australian tennis player